Mariam Petrosyan (born 1991) is a Russian-Armenian singer and songwriter. She is best known for competing in season 2 of Depi Evratesil 2018 with the song Fade, which qualified for the final.
 
In 2014, Petrosyan competed in a competition-festival I love New York and won it with her own song. In October 2016, she also entered a competition called Songwriting competition in London and reached the final. This year, Mariam along with Alpha Lighting System was the winner of 7 Notes Challenge, with her own song Here I Come, a competition organized by Serj Tankian. Tankian has commented on the song by saying "A hauntingly beautiful song that won't leave me."

Filmography

References

External links 
 Facebook
 Page on eurovision.am

1991 births
Alumni of the University of West London
21st-century Armenian women singers
Armenian pop singers
Armenian songwriters
Living people
Musicians from Yerevan
Komitas State Conservatory of Yerevan alumni
Russian people of Armenian descent